The Toyota TR engine is a family of gasoline engines that appeared in 2004. They are mainly used for Toyota Hilux and other vehicles in the Toyota IMV platform; and are designed to be mounted longitudinally for pickup RWD and 4WD pickup applications.

1TR-FE

The 1TR-FE is a  Straight-4 gasoline engine. It features DOHC, 16 valves and VVT-i. Bore and stroke is 86 mm × 86 mm (3.39 in × 3.39 in).

Just like its sister, the 2TR-FE engine, the 1TR-FE engine also received a Dual VVT-i update.

Applications
Toyota Innova
Toyota HiAce
Toyota Hilux
Toyota Comfort Driver's Education Car

1TR-FPE
The 1TR-FPE is an LPG version of the 1TR-FE engine. The compression ratio is 10.6:1.

Applications
Toyota Comfort Taxi
Toyota Dyna Medium-Duty Truck

2TR-FE
The 2TR-FE is a  Straight-4 gasoline engine. It features DOHC, 16 valves and VVT-i. The compression ratio is 9.6:1 for the single VVT-i.

The 2TR-FE received updates in 2015 to feature Dual VVT-i. The compression ratio is raised to 10.2:1 for the Dual VVT-i version.

Applications
Toyota Hilux Surf
Toyota Land Cruiser Prado (updated with Dual VVT-i)
Toyota Fortuner (updated with Dual VVT-i)
Toyota Tacoma (updated with Dual VVT-i)
Toyota HiAce
Toyota Coaster (Bolivia, Hong Kong, Australia)
Toyota Innova (in some countries and updated with Dual VVT-i)
Toyota Hilux (in some countries and updated with Dual VVT-i)
Toyota 4Runner (2010 MY)

See also

 List of Toyota engines

References

TR engine

Straight-four engines
Gasoline engines by model